Mario Morales Micheo (born November 13, 1957) is a former Puerto Rican basketball player. He is known as a.k.a. "Quijote" Morales for his ability to conquer both scoring and team championships in Puerto Rico's BSN league. He is the father of Evansville Purple Aces women's volleyball coach Fernando Morales Lopez. And he also played for the Villanova Wildcats Men's Basketball team in 1975-76 season where he averaged 4.7 points and 1.5 rebounds and Villanova went 16-11.

Biography

Professional career
Morales became a member of the BSN's Cangrejeros De Santurce in 1974, when he was only 17 while still playing high school basketball at the Colegio De La Salle in Bayamon, Puerto Rico. Four years later he became a member of Puerto Rico's national basketball team. Morales didn't go to the Montreal Olympics because, being under 21 years old in 1976, he still couldn't join the national team, the 1980 Olympics in Moscow, because Puerto Rico's Olympic committee decided to join the United States in the boycott, and the 1984 Los Angeles Olympic Games because the national team did not qualify for those. However, when he did get to go to the Olympics, for the Seoul games in 1988 and the Barcelona games in 1992, he impressed international audiences with his skills and savvy.

In between Olympics and Olympics, he became an effective shooter from the 3-point area in the BSN. In 1976, the Cangrejeros became the Mets de Guaynabo, and Morales, aided with the help of his brother in law Federico Fico Lopez, took the Mets to a total of 8 BSN finals, winning 3 championships along the way. The 1989 finals where they won it in 7 games beating the Leones de Ponce, featured a classic game 7, where they had to go into overtime before edging out an 89-84 decision.

Morales had his eyes set on the NBA, but after attending college in the United States, the lack of understanding of English became too difficult for him to overcome, and he decided to return to Puerto Rico.

Like other highly educated Puerto Rican athletes, such as the case of internationally renowned Juan "Pachin" Vicens, Mario "Quijote" Morales holds a CPA (Certified Public Accountant) license.

Retirement
After he retired, the coliseum where he played for most of his career, Guaynabo's Mets Pavilion, was renamed the Mario Quijote Morales Coliseum. There is a large painting of him in a Guaynabo Mets uniform just to the entrance of the coliseum. Pfizer made Morales a spokesperson for Viagra in 2004.

Legal troubles
On 4 June 2016, the Puerto Rico Police charged Morales with driving under the influence. An alcohol test showed he had an alcohol level of 0.17 percent, the maximum legal level in Puerto Rico being 0.08 percent.

See also 

 List of Puerto Ricans - Sports
 Teófilo Cruz
 Raymond Dalmau

References

External links
 Statistics in BSN
 Gallery of Pictures of Puerto Rican players at enciclopediapr.org
 https://www.sports-reference.com/cbb/schools/villanova/1976.html

1957 births
Living people
Baloncesto Superior Nacional players
Puerto Rico men's national basketball team players
Puerto Rican men's basketball players
1978 FIBA World Championship players
Olympic basketball players of Puerto Rico
Basketball players at the 1979 Pan American Games
Basketball players at the 1983 Pan American Games
Basketball players at the 1988 Summer Olympics
Basketball players at the 1992 Summer Olympics
Pan American Games silver medalists for Puerto Rico
Pan American Games medalists in basketball
Forwards (basketball)
Medalists at the 1979 Pan American Games
People from Bayamón, Puerto Rico